State Organization for Marketing of Oil (SOMO) is an Iraqi national company responsible for marketing Iraq's oil. It is headquartered in Baghdad, Iraq.

History
The company was founded in 1998 and operates in oil and gas sector.

References

External links

 Official website

Oil and gas companies of Iraq
Companies based in Baghdad